The fifth season of NYPD Blue premiered on ABC on September 30, 1997, and concluded on May 19, 1998.

Episodes

References

NYPD Blue seasons
1997 American television seasons
1998 American television seasons